Bobby Thompson (born Robert Clark Thompson; July 5, 1937 – May 18, 2005) was an American banjoist and guitarist. He worked as a session musician from the 1960s through 1980s. He recorded with Johnny Cash, Loretta Lynn, Neil Young, Perry Como, among others.

Thompson was born in Converse, South Carolina. In the late 1960s, he joined his fellow session musicians, Weldon Myrick, Charlie McCoy to form Area Code 615.

He died in 2005 at the age of 67.

Selected discography

With The Monkees
 The Monkees Present (1969)
 Missing Links Volume Two (1990)
With Charley Pride
 Christmas in My Home Town (1970)
 Charley (1975)
 The Happiness of Having You (1975)
With Dottie West
 Country and West (1970)
 Forever Yours (1970)
 If It's All Right With You/Just What I've Been Looking For (1972)
 Country Sunshine (1973)
 Carolina Cousins (1975)
With Willie Nelson
 Yesterday's Wine (1971)
With The Everly Brothers
 Pass the Chicken & Listen (1972)
With Donna Fargo
 My Second Album (1972)
 All About a Feeling (1973)
With Porter Wagoner and Dolly Parton
 Together Always (1972)
With Johnny Cash
 Any Old Wind That Blows (1973)
 Look at Them Beans (1975)
 One Piece at a Time (1976)
 Rockabilly Blues (1980)
With Hank Wilson
 Hank Wilson's Back Vol. I (1973)
With Tom Rapp / Pearls Before Swine
 Sunforest (1973)
With Ferlin Husky
 Champagne Ladies and Blue Ribbon Babies (1974)
With Waylon Jennings
 The Ramblin' Man (1974)
With The Pointer Sisters
 That's a Plenty (1974)
With The Statler Brothers
 Sons of the Motherland (1974)
With Ronnie Milsap
 A Legend in My Time (1975)
With Jimmy Buffett
 High Cumberland Jubilee (1976)
With Eddie Rabbitt
 Rocky Mountain Music (1976)
 Rabbitt (1977)
With England Dan & John Ford Coley
 Nights Are Forever (1976)
 Dowdy Ferry Road (1977)
 Some Things Don't Come Easy (1978)
With Barbara Mandrell
 Lovers, Friends and Strangers (1977)
With Dolly Parton
 Jolene (1974)
 New Harvest...First Gathering (1977)
With Mickey Newbury
 Frisco Mabel Joy (1971)
 Heaven Help the Child (1973)
 Rusty Tracks (1977)
 The Sailor (1979)
With The Oak Ridge Boys
 Y'all Come Back Saloon (1977)
 Room Service (1978)
 The Oak Ridge Boys Have Arrived (1979)
 Together (1980)
With Margo Smith
 A Woman (1979)
Soundtrack
 Malibu Express (1980)
With Jerry Lee Lewis
 When Two Worlds Collide (1980)
 Killer Country (1980)
With Dan Seals
 Stones (1980)
 Harbinger (1982)
 Rebel Heart (1983)
 San Antone (1984)
 Won't Be Blue Anymore (1985)
With Hank Williams Jr.
 Habits Old and New (1980)
 Rowdy (1981)
 The Pressure Is On (1981)
 High Notes (1982)
With John Anderson
 I Just Came Home to Count the Memories (1981)
With Loretta Lynn
 I Lie (1982)
With Reba McEntire
 Unlimited (1982)
 Behind the Scene (1983)
 My Kind of Country (1984)
With Chet Atkins
 Great Hits of the Past (1983)
With Neil Young
 Old Ways (1985)

Notes

External links
Bobby Thompson (1937 - 2005) - Find A Grave Memorial

1937 births
2005 deaths
people from Spartanburg County, South Carolina
American session musicians
American banjoists